Capital punishment is a legal penalty in Egypt. The state carried out at least 44 executions in 2016, at least 35 in 2017, and at least 43 in 2018. On 8 September 2020, a court in Egypt sentenced 75 people to death and 47 others to life imprisonment. They were charged with murder or membership in a terrorist group. The British newspaper Independent has reported that Najia Bounaim of Amnesty International Middle East and North Africa described the court's sentence to “disgraceful" and "a mockery of justice". The method of execution is hanging for civilian convictions, and by firing squad for convictions by commissioned military personnel at the time of duty.

The Grand Mufti of Egypt Shawki Ibrahim Abdel-Karim Allam, is responsible under Egyptian law for reviewing all death sentences in Egypt. Legally, his opinion is consultative and non-binding to the presiding court that handed down the death sentence.

Port Said Stadium disaster

On 26 January 2013, an Egyptian court gave death sentences to 21 people convicted of involvement in a mass attack by fans of the Al-Masry Club against fans of the Al-Ahly Sports Club at Port Said Stadium on 1 February 2012. At least 72 people died in violence that erupted in Port Said, Egypt, during the Port Said Stadium disaster. A retrial was ordered on 6 February 2014 and the number sentenced to death was reduced to 11 on 19 April 2015.

2014 mass trials
Amid political unrest following the 2013 Egyptian coup d'état, a court sentenced 683 suspected Muslim Brotherhood members to death on 28 April 2014, including the group's supreme guide, Mohamed Badie, and confirmed the death sentences of 37 of 529 alleged supporters previously condemned. The defendants were accused of violence at two sit-ins in Cairo, held by supporters of deposed President Mohamed Morsi, which the police launched a deadly clearance of on 14 August 2013. Mohamed Elmessiry, an Amnesty International researcher monitoring the cases, said they "lacked basic fair trial guarantees". The defendants from the first case whose death sentences were not upheld were each sentenced to 25 years in prison.

Judge Saeed Youssef first attracted international condemnation and prompted an outcry from foreign human rights groups after he handed down the initial sentence for the 529 defendants on March 24, following a brief trial marked by irregularities. Later he reversed 492 of those 529 death sentences, commuting most of them to life in prison.

Egyptian law requires that death sentences are confirmed by the presiding judge after reviewing the opinion of the Grand Mufti of Egypt, the country's leading official legal expert on religious matters. The Mufti's opinion to the judge is confidential. The guilty verdict and death sentences are still subject to review by appellate courts. "The case killed the credibility of the Egyptian judicial system," said Elmessiry of Amnesty International.

2020 mass executions
Amnesty International accused Egyptian authorities of executing 57 people in October and November alone, nearly double the number recorded in the whole of 2019. Amnesty said the spike in executions followed a botched breakout attempt in September at the Tora Prison in Cairo. Four police officers and four death-row prisoners died in the attempt.

Amnesty International’s annual global review of death penalty ranked Egypt as the world’s third most frequent executioner in 2020. Egypt executed at least 107 people in 2020 following grossly unfair trials and forced confessions as lawyers could not meet their clients or conduct proper investigations due to the COVID-19 pandemic.

Venues
Executions by hanging have generally been carried out at the Cairo Central Prison. However prisons of Wadi Al Natrun and Burj Al Arab both house an execution chamber.

Notes

Egypt
Murder in Egypt
Law of Egypt
Human rights abuses in Egypt